Mustafa Mohammad (Body Builder) (born January 1, 1968) is a retired IFBB professional bodybuilder.He came in tenth place in the championship of Mr. Olympia held in Las Vegas in 2005. He was elected in 2013 as Assistant President of the Austrian Federation of Bodybuilding and Fitness, and Assistant to the President of the European Federation of Bodybuilding and Fitness.

Competitive stats 
Age 51
Height 5'8"
Contest Weight 270 lbs (122.5 kg)
Arm size 	21.65" (55 cm)
Thigh size	32.29" (82 cm)
Country Jordan
Olympia History 2004, 17th; 2005, 10th
Odds 12:1

Contest history
1989 World Amateur Bodybuilding Championships, Light-Heavyweight, 11th
1991 NABBA Mr Universe, Medium-Tall, 2nd
1992 NABBA Mr Universe, Medium-Tall, 1st and Overall
1992 Universe ChampionshipsNABBA World Championships, Winner
2001 Grand Prix England, Did not place
2001 Night of Champions, Did not place
2002 Grand Prix Austria, 13th
2002 Night of Champions, 12th
2002 Toronto Pro Invitational, 7th
2003 Grand Prix England, 4th
2003 Grand Prix Holland, 3rd
2003 Grand Prix Hungary, 8th
2003 Night of Champions, Did not place
2004 Arnold Classic, 12th
2004 Grand Prix Holland, 3rd
2004 Mr. Olympia, 17th
2004 San Francisco Pro Invitational, 7th
2005 Charlotte Pro Championships, 4th
2005 Europa Supershow, 5th
2005 New York Pro Championships, 10th
2005 Mr. Olympia, 10th
2006 Arnold Classic, 7th
2006 Grand Prix Australia, 4th
2006 Ironman Pro Invitational, 6th
2006 San Francisco Pro Invitational, 4th
2006 Mr. Olympia, 16th (tied)
2006 Grand Prix Austria, 9th

References

External links
arnoldclassic.com
Muscle Fantasy League
His fitness club in 1200 Wien, Austria

See also
Arnold Classic
List of male professional bodybuilders
List of female professional bodybuilders
Mr. Olympia

Jordanian bodybuilders
Professional bodybuilders
Living people
1968 births